This is a list of airports with "Executive" in the title.

List of executive airports

Canada
 Burlington Executive Airport
 Gatineau-Ottawa Executive Airport
 Oshawa Executive Airport

United Arab Emirates
 Al Bateen Executive Airport

United States
 Akron Executive Airport
 Ardmore Downtown Executive Airport
 Austin Executive Airport
 Avon Park Executive Airport
 Brunswick Executive Airport
 Calverton Executive Airpark
 Chicago Executive Airport
 Charleston Executive Airport
 Charlotte–Monroe Executive Airport
 Dallas Executive Airport
 Destin Executive Airport
 Fort Lauderdale Executive Airport
 Fresno Chandler Executive Airport
 Hampton Roads Executive Airport
 Hayward Executive Airport
 Henderson Executive Airport
 Houston Executive Airport
 Indianapolis Executive Airport
 Jacksonville Executive at Craig Airport
 Johnson County Executive Airport
 Leesburg Executive Airport
 Allentown Queen City Municipal Airport (Little Lehigh Executive)
 Madison County Executive Airport (Huntsville Executive)
 Marco Island Executive Airport
 Miami Executive Airport (formerly Kendall-Tamiami Executive Airport)
 Miami-Opa Locka Executive Airport
 Millville Executive Airport
 Monmouth Executive Airport
 Montgomery-Gibbs Executive Airport
 Opa-locka Executive Airport
 Orlando Executive Airport
 Raleigh Executive Jetport 
 Rogers Executive Airport
 Sacramento Executive Airport
 Suffolk Executive Airport
 Tampa Executive Airport
 Toledo Executive Airport
 Triangle North Executive Airport
 Virginia Tech Montgomery Executive Airport
 Washington Executive Airport (Hyde Field)
 W.K. Kellogg Executive Airport

See also
 General aviation
 Reliever airport

References

Airports by type